The M-V rocket, also called M-5 or Mu-5, was a Japanese solid-fuel rocket designed to launch scientific satellites. It was a member of the Mu family of rockets. The Institute of Space and Astronautical Science (ISAS) began developing the M-V in 1990 at a cost of 15 billion yen.

The first M-V rocket launched the HALCA radio astronomy satellite in 1997, and the second the Nozomi Mars explorer in July 1998. The third rocket attempted to launch the Astro-E X-ray satellite on 10 February 2000 but failed. ISAS recovered from this setback and launched Hayabusa to 25143 Itokawa in 2003. The following M-V launch was the scientific Astro-E2 satellite, a replacement for Astro-E, which took place on 10 July 2005. The final launch was that of the Hinode (SOLAR-B) spacecraft, along with the SSSat microsat and a nanosatellite, HIT-SAT, on 22 September 2006.

Launch outcomes

Launch history

Following program 

A follow on to the M-V, called the Epsilon Rocket, features a lower 1.2 tonne LEO payload capability. The development aim is to reduce costs, primarily by using the H-IIA solid rocket booster as the first stage and through shorter launch preparation time. Epsilon launches are intended to cost much less than the US$70 million launch cost of a M-V.

The first launch, of a small scientific satellite SPRINT-A (Hisaki), took place in September 2013. The initial launches will be of a two-stage version, of Epsilon, with up to a 500 kilogram LEO payload capability.

Potential as an intercontinental ballistic missile 
Solid fuel rockets are the design of choice for military applications as they can remain in storage for long periods, and then reliably launch at short notice.

Lawmakers made national security arguments for keeping Japan's solid-fuel rocket technology alive after ISAS was merged into JAXA, which also has the H-IIA liquid-fuelled rocket, in 2003. The ISAS director of external affairs, Yasunori Matogawa, said, "It seems the hard-line national security proponents in parliament are increasing their influence, and they aren't getting much criticism... I think we’re moving into a very dangerous period. When you consider the current environment and the threat from North Korea, it's scary".

Toshiyuki Shikata, a Tokyo Metropolitan Government adviser and former lieutenant general, claimed that part of the rationale for the fifth M-V Hayabusa mission was that the reentry and landing of its return capsule demonstrated "that Japan's ballistic missile capability is credible".

At a technical level the M-V design could be weaponised quickly (as an Intercontinental ballistic missile, since only payload and guidance have to be changed) although this would be politically unlikely. The M-V is comparable in performance to the LGM-118 Peacekeeper ICBM.

Comparable solid fuel rockets 

 Athena II
 Epsilon
 Minotaur IV
 Shavit
 Minotaur-C
 Vega

See also 

 Comparison of orbital launchers families
 Comparison of orbital launch systems

References

External links 

 M-V page in ISAS site of JAXA
 Epsilon Launch Vehicle at JAXA
 M-V, Encyclopedia Astronautica

Solid-fuel rockets
Space launch vehicles of Japan